The 2019 season is Persija's 86th competitive season. They have not been relegated since the competition started in 1933. This season is Persija's 25th consecutive seasons in top-flight since professional competition formed on 1994. Along with Liga 1, the club will compete in 2018-19 Piala Indonesia, 2019–20 Piala Indonesia and 2019 AFC Champions League since 2001–02 season. The season covers the period from 1 January 2019 to 31 December 2019.

Coaching staff

Management

|-

 
|}

New contracts

Transfers

In

Out

Loan In

Loan Out

Squad information

First team squad

Pre-season

Friendly Matches

2019 Indonesia President's Cup

Group stage

Knockout phase

Competitions

Overview

Top scorers
The list is sorted by shirt number when total goals are equal.

Top assist
The list is sorted by shirt number when total assists are equal.

Clean sheets
The list is sorted by shirt number when total clean sheets are equal.

Disciplinary record
Includes all competitive matches. Players listed below made at least one appearance for Persija Jakarta first squad during the season.

Last updated:  
Source: Competitions 
Only competitive matches 
 = Number of bookings;  = Number of sending offs after a second yellow card;  = Number of sending offs by a direct red card.

Summary

References

Persija Jakarta
Persija Jakarta seasons